R. robusta  may refer to:
 Rhodospatha robusta, a plant species endemic to Ecuador
 Rosenblattia robusta, a deepwater cardinalfish species

See also
 Robusta (disambiguation)